Grøa is a village in Sunndal Municipality in Møre og Romsdal county, Norway.

See also
Other neighboring villages in Sunndal municipality: Gjøra, Hoelsand, Jordalsgrenda, Romfo, Ålvund, Ålvundeidet, and Øksendalsøra.

References

Sunndal
Villages in Møre og Romsdal